Saint Lucia observes Atlantic Standard Time (UTC−4) year-round.

IANA time zone database 
In the IANA time zone database, Saint Lucia is given one zone in the file zone.tab—America/Port_of_Spain, which is synonymous with the zone for time in Trinidad and Tobago. Kitts and Nevis and Saint Vincent and the Grenadines also share America/Port_of_Spain. Data for America/Port_of_Spain directly from zone.tab of the IANA time zone database; columns marked with * are the columns from zone.tab itself:

References

External links 
Current time in Saint Lucia at Time.is
Time in Saint Lucia at TimeAndDate

Time in Saint Lucia